The 56th (London) Infantry Division was a Territorial Army infantry division of the British Army, which served under several different titles and designations. The division served in the trenches of the Western Front during the First World War. Demobilised after the war, the division was reformed in 1920 and saw active service again in the Second World War in Tunisia and Italy. The division was again disbanded in 1946 and reformed first as an armoured formation and then as an infantry division before final disbandment in 1961.

Formation
The Territorial Force (TF) was formed on 1 April 1908 following the enactment of the Territorial and Reserve Forces Act 1907 (7 Edw.7, c.9) which combined and re-organised the old Volunteer Force, the Honourable Artillery Company and the Yeomanry.  On formation, the TF contained 14 infantry divisions and 14 mounted yeomanry brigades.  One of the divisions was the 1st London Division. It was a wholly new formation, although its three infantry brigade headquarters (HQs) had previously existed in the Volunteers, as had most of its constituent units. The division comprised the first 12 battalions of the all-TF London Regiment, the first four London brigades of the Royal Field Artillery and the former Tower Hamlets Engineers; most of the supporting arms were newly raised. Essentially, all these units were based in inner London, while the 2nd London Division consisted of TF units recruited from suburban London. 1st London Division's HQ was at Friar's House in New Broad Street in the City of London.

First World War
On the outbreak of war in August 1914 the division's units had just left for their annual training camps, the 1st and 3rd London Brigades around Wool, Dorset, and the 2nd at Eastbourne, Sussex. They immediately returned to their drill halls to mobilise, and then proceeded to their initial war stations guarding railways in Southern England. The TF was now invited to volunteer for Overseas Service, and most units did so; those men who had signed up for Home Service only, together with the floods of volunteers enlisting, were formed into reserve or 2nd Line units and formations with a '2/' prefix, while the parent unit took a '1/' prefix. 1/1st London Division immediately began supplying reinforcements to the Regular Army overseas. On 1 September the whole of 1/1st London Brigade, with its associated signal and medical units, set off to relieve the regular garrison of Malta; individual battalions joined the British Expeditionary Force on the Western Front. By early January 1915 the 1st Line division had ceased to exist and its remaining units had been attached to its 2nd Line duplicate, the 2/1st London Division.

On 7 January 1916 the Army Council authorised the re-formation in France of the division as 56th (1/1st London) Division. As many as possible of the original units or other London units were assembled and by 21 February the bulk of the division had concentrated around Hallencourt between Abbeville and Arras under the command of Maj-Gen C.P. Amyatt Hull. Although the division was effectively a new formation, its constituent units were now experienced in trench warfare. After shaking down it took its place in the line in the Hébuterne sector.

56th Division's first operation as a complete formation was the Attack on the Gommecourt Salient on 1 July 1916, the First day on the Somme. Extensive (and obvious) preparations were made for this attack, which was a diversion from the main Somme Offensive. The leading battalions gained a lodgement in the German front line with comparatively light losses, but they came under heavy counter-attack and were cut off from reinforcements and ammunition resupply by an intense barrage laid down in No man's land by the German artillery. At nightfall the survivors made their way back to British lines, the division having lost over 4300 casualties, mainly among the seven attacking battalions.

56th (1/1st London) Division served on the Western Front for the rest of the war, taking part in the following operations:

1916
 Battle of Ginchy (9 September)
 Battle of Flers–Courcelette (15–22 September)
 Battle of Morval (25–27 September)
 Capture of Combles (26 September)
 Battle of the Transloy Ridges (1–9 October)

1917
 German Retreat to the Hindenburg Line (14 March-5 April)
 Battle of Arras (9 April–4 May)
 Battle of Langemarck (16–17 August)
 Battle of Cambrai (21 November–2 December)

1918
 Battle of Arras (28 March)
 Battle of Albert (23 August)
 Battle of the Scarpe (26–30 August)
 Battle of the Canal du Nord (27 September–1 October)
 Battle of Cambrai (8–9 October)
 Pursuit to the Selle (9–12 October)
 Battle of the Sambre (4 November)
 Passage of the Grand Honnelle (5–7 November)

By midnight on 10 November the division was relieved in the front line and drawn back into Corps support, but the divisional artillery remained in action until the Cease Fire sounded at 11.00 on 11 November when the Armistice with Germany came into force. During the 1010 days of its existence since re-formation, the division spent 100 days in active operations, 385 days in an active sector, 195 days in a quiet sector and 100 days at rest, although the divisional artillery was frequently left in the line after the withdrawal of the infantry of the division. Its total casualties were 1470 officers and 33,339 other ranks, killed, wounded and missing.

After the Armistice the division was engaged in road-mending etc. The first parties left for demobilisation in mid-December and the division gradually dwindled. Divisional HQ left for England on 18 May 1919 and the final cadre followed on 10 June. The division. began reforming in London District in April 1920.

Interwar years
The division reformed as the 56th (1st London) Infantry Division in the renamed Territorial Army (TA) with much the same composition as before the First World War.

In 1935 the increasing need for anti-aircraft (AA) defence, particularly for London, was addressed by converting the 47th (2nd London) Division into the 1st Anti-Aircraft Division. A number of London infantry battalions and were also converted to the AA role. The remainder were concentrated in 56th (1st London) Division, which henceforth was simply designated The London Division, with its HQ at Finsbury Barracks. It was converted into a two-brigade motorised division in 1938 as 1st (London) Motor Division, under Major-General Claude Liardet, the first TA officer appointed to command a division. After the Munich Crisis the TA once again expanded by creating duplicate units, and the 2nd (London) Motor Division began to come ito existence in March 1939.

Second World War
1st (London) Motor Division mobilised at the outbreak of the Second World War in September 1939. It was reorganised as an infantry division in June 1940 and renamed the 56th (London) Infantry Division on 18 November 1940. The divisional insignia during the Second World War was changed to an outline of a black cat in a red background. The cat stood for Dick Whittington's cat, a symbol of London.

The division remained in the United Kingdom during the Battle of France, moving to the Middle East in November 1942, where it served in Iraq and Palestine, until moving to Egypt in March 1943 and thence forward to Libya and the front, in April. The division, minus the 168th Brigade, fought in the final stages of the Tunisian Campaign, where it suffered heavy casualties facing the German 90th Light Infantry Division, including its GOC, Major-General Miles, who had been in command since October 1941. He was replaced by Major-General Douglas Graham.

The division sat out the Allied invasion of Sicily and moved to Italy in September 1943, where they fought in the landings at Salerno under the command of the British X Corps. During this time the 201st Guards Brigade joined the division, to replace the 168th Brigade which returned to the division in October, although the 201st remained attached until January 1944. The 56th Division then crossed the Volturno Line in October and took part in the fighting around the Bernhardt Line. In January 1944, the 56th Division, now commanded by Major-General Gerald Templer, saw service in the Battle of Monte Cassino, serving there until February 1944 and participated in the Anzio campaign until relieved in March.

After being withdrawn to Egypt at the end of March, the division, under Major-General John Whitfield, returned to Italy in July 1944, where it took part in the Battles along the Gothic Line and remained there until after Victory in Europe Day. During the fighting of 1944 and 1945, some of the infantry battalions that suffered heavy casualties were disbanded, to make up for an acute manpower shortage. The division also took part in Operation Grapeshot, the Allied offensive which ended the war in Italy.

After crossing the Volturno in October 1943, the division entered the town of Calvi Vecchia. Their attempts to radio the Fifth Army to cancel a planned bombing on the town failed. As a last resort, the 56th released an American homing pigeon, named G.I. Joe, which carried a message that reached the allies just as the planes were being warmed up. The attack was called off and the town was saved from the planned air assault.

Postwar

In 1946, the 56th Division was demobilised then re-constituted in 1947 as the 56th (London) Armoured Division. On 20 December 1955, the Secretary of State for War informed the House of Commons that the armoured divisions and the 'mixed' division were to be converted to infantry. The 56th Division was one of the eight divisions placed on a lower establishment for home defence only. The territorial units of the Royal Armoured Corps were reduced to nine armoured regiments and eleven reconnaissance regiments by amalgamating pairs of regiments and the conversion of four RAC units to infantry.

On 20 July 1960, a further reduction of the T.A. was announced in the House of Commons. The Territorials were to be reduced from 266 fighting units to 195. The reductions were carried out in 1961, mainly by the amalgamation of units. On 1 May 1961, the T.A. divisional headquarters were merged with regular army districts and matched with Civil Defence Regions, to aid the mobilisation for war. The division ceased to exist as an independent entity and was linked to London District.

The 4th Battalion, Queen's Royal Surrey Regiment was formed in 1961, by the amalgamation of the 6th Battalion, East Surrey Regiment and the 23rd London Regiment, with a Battalion HQ and HQ Company at Kingston upon Thames. It formed part of 47th (London) Infantry Brigade (56th London Division/District). An echo of the 56th Division emerged again from 1987 to 1993, when the public duties battalions in the London District were grouped as the 56th Infantry Brigade.

Insignia
During the First World War, 56th (1/1st London) Division wore as its formation sign the sword symbolising the martyrdom of Paul the Apostle from the coat of arms of the City of London. A new sign consisting of the red sword of St Paul on a khaki background was authorised in 1936 for the London Division in case of war, but it was never used.

During the Second World War, 56th (London) Division adopted a black silhouette of Dick Whittington's cat on a red ground as its formation sign, leading to its nickname of the 'Black Cats'.

From 1948 56th (London) Armoured Division wore a blue knight's helmet superimposed on the upright red sword, but in 1951 it resumed the black cat, now with the red sword superimposed.

Victoria Cross recipients
 Corporal James McPhie, 416th (Edinburgh) Field Company, Royal Engineers, First World War
 Private George Mitchell, 1st Battalion, London Scottish, Second World War

General officers commanding
The following officers commanded the division:

Order of battle

See also

 List of British divisions in World War I
 List of British divisions in World War II
 British Army Order of Battle (September 1939)
 Independent Company

Footnotes

Notes

References

 Anon, Short History of the London Rifle Brigade, Aldershot, 1916/Uckfield: Naval & Military, 2002, .
 Bailey, Sgt O.F.; Hollier, Sgt H.M. (2002) "The Kensingtons" 13th London Regiment, London: Regimental Old Comrades' Association, 1935/Uckfield: Naval & Military Press, .
 Barnes, Maj R. Money (1963) The Soldiers of London, London: Seeley Service.
 Becke, Maj A.F. (2007) History of the Great War: Order of Battle of Divisions, Part 2a: The Territorial Force Mounted Divisions and the 1st-Line Territorial Force Divisions (42–56), London: HM Stationery Office, 1935/Uckfield: Naval & Military Press, .
 Beckett, Ian F.W. (2008) Territorials: A Century of Service, first published by DRA Printing of 14 Mary Seacole Road, The Millfields, Plymouth PL1 3JY on behalf of TA 100, .
 Blaxland, Gregory (1979). Alexander's Generals (the Italian Campaign 1944–1945). London: William Kimber. .
 .
 Edmonds, Brig-Gen Sir James E., History of the Great War: Military Operations, France and Belgium, 1916, Vol I, London: Macmillan,1932/Woking: Shearer, 1986, .
 Edwards, Maj D.K. (1967) A History of the 1st Middlesex Volunteer Engineers (101 (London) Engineer Regiment, TA) 1860–1967, London.
 D'Este, Carlo (1991). Fatal Decision: Anzio and the Battle for Rome. New York: Harper. .
 Grimwade, Capt F. Clive (2002) The War History of the 4th Battalion The London Regiment (Royal Fusiliers) 1914–1919, London: Regimental Headquarters, 1922/Uckfield, Naval & Military Press, .
 Jackson, Gen Sir William, History of the Second World War, United Kingdom Military Series: The Mediterranean and Middle East, Vol VI: Victory in the Mediterranean, Part I|: June to October 1944, London: HM Stationery Office, 1987/Uckfield, Naval & Military Press, 2004, .
 
 Keeson, Maj C.A. Cuthbert The History and Records of Queen Victoria's Rifles 1792–1922, London: Constable, 1923/Uckfield: Naval & Military Press, 2002, .
 
 Litchfield, Norman E.H. (1992) The Territorial Artillery 1908–1988 (Their Lineage, Uniforms and Badges), Nottingham: Sherwood Press, .
 Lord, Cliff; Watson, Graham (2003) Royal Corps of Signals: Unit Histories of the Corps (1920–2001) and its Antecedents, Solihull: Helion, .
 Nalder, Maj-Gen R.F.H. (1958) The Royal Corps of Signals: A History of its Antecedents and Developments (Circa 1800–1955), London: Royal Signals Institution.
 Planck, C. Digby The Shiny Seventh: History of the 7th (City of London) Battalion London Regiment, London: Old Comrades' Association, 1946/Uckfield: Naval & Military Press, 2002, .
 Ward, Maj C.H. Dudley The Fifty Sixth Division, 1st London Territorial Division, 1914–1918, London: John Murray, 1921/Uckfield: Naval & Military Press, 2001, .
 Watson, Graham E.; Rinaldi, Richard A. (2018) The Corps of Royal Engineers: Organization and Units 1889–2018, Tiger Lily Books, .
 
 Wheeler-Holohan, Capt A.V.; & Wyatt, Capt G.M.G. (eds), The Rangers' Historical Records from 1859 to the Conclusion of the Great War, London: Regimental Headquarters, 1921/Uckfield: Naval & Military Press, 2003, .
 Williams, David, The Black Cats at War: The Story of the 56th (London) Division T.A., 1939–1945.
 Young, Lt-Col Michael (2000) Army Service Corps 1902–1918, Barnsley: Leo Cooper, .

External links
 The Long, Long Trail
 56 Infantry Division (1942–43)
 56 Infantry Division (1943–45)
 Land Forces of Britain, the Empire and Commonwealth – Regiments.org (archive site)
 The Regimental Warpath 1914–1918 (archive site)
 Graham Watson, The Territorial Army 1947
 British Army units from 1945 on

Infantry divisions of the British Army in World War I
Infantry divisions of the British Army in World War II
Military units and formations established in 1908
Military units and formations disestablished in 1919
Military units and formations established in 1940
Military units and formations disestablished in 1945
Military units and formations established in 1947
Military units and formations disestablished in 1961
Military units and formations in London
1908 establishments in the United Kingdom